John Roderick MacDonald (July 9, 1891 – December 18, 1959) - consecrated as Bishop of Peterborough, Ontario, August 24, 1943: appointed Titular Bishop of Ancusa and Coadjutor-Bishop of Antigonish with right of succession March 3, 1945: succeeded Archbishop James Morrison to the See April 13, 1950; died December 18, 1959.

External links
 Profile of Mons. MacDonald www.catholic-hierarchy.org
 Diocese of Antigonish

1891 births
1959 deaths
Roman Catholic bishops of Peterborough
20th-century Roman Catholic bishops in Canada
Roman Catholic bishops of Antigonish